Afsana Ara Bindu is a Bangladeshi model and actress. She got her break as a model on the 2006 season of reality television show Lux Channel I Superstar, in which she was the first runner-up. Soon after this, she landed a brief role in Tauquir Ahmed's Daruchini Dip. She then appeared in Jaago - Dare to Dream and Piriter Agun Jole Digun. Bindu's last film was Eito Prem (2015).

Career
Bindu is a model, presenter and actress. She comes in film win after Peeriter Dokandari. Then she has worked Daruchini Deep and Jaago in these movies. Besides, she has also worked in film like Priter Agun Jole Digun and Eito Prem. She has acting with different actors in film as Arefin Shuvo, Ferdous, Emon, Shakib Khan and so on. Besides, she has also worked in drama, telefilm, package drama and advertisement. She has worked with many actors in the drama such as Shajal, Chanchal Chowdhury, Mosharraf Karim, and Nobel and so on.

Awards and nominations
 1st runner up of the 2006 LUX Channel I Superstar
 Nominated in primary selection of Meril-Prothom Alo Award Show for her film Daruchini Deep

Filmography

Television

References

Further reading

External links
 

Living people
Bangladeshi television actresses
Bangladeshi female models
Bangladeshi film actresses
1986 births